Koo De Tah is the first and only studio album by Australian band Koo De Tah. The album was released in September 1986 and peaked at No. 54 on the Australian Albums Chart. In 2021, the album was reissued on LP and CD.

Track listing
All songs written by Leon Berger.

Charts

References

1986 debut albums
Koo De Tah albums